The Quintuplet cluster is a dense cluster of massive young stars about 100 light years from the Galactic Center (GC). Its name comes from the fact it has five prominent infrared sources residing in it. Along with the Arches Cluster it is one of two in the immediate GC region. Due to heavy extinction by dust in the vicinity, it is invisible to optical observation and must be studied in the X-ray, radio, and infrared bands.

The Quintuplet is less compact than the nearby Arches Cluster, with fewer of the most massive and luminous stars, but it does have the distinction of hosting two of the extremely rare luminous blue variables, the Pistol Star and the less well-known qF 362 (aka V4650 Sgr), and a third just a few parsecs away.  It also contains a number of red supergiants, all suggesting a slightly more evolved cluster around 4 million years old.

Discovery and naming

The Quintuplet was originally identified in 1983 as a pair of infra-red sources in a 2.5 micron survey of the galactic centre. These two sources were numbered 3 and 4, and later referred to with the acronym GCS for Galactic Centre Source. GCS-3 was later resolved into four sources, labelled I-IV, that together with GCS-4 formed a compact quintuplet of unusually bright small objects. They were assumed to be young hot luminous stars surrounded by dust shells and therefore extremely reddened.

In 1990, a total of 15 sources in the Quintuplet region was studied in more detail at several wavelengths, later referred to by Q or GMM (after the authors Glass, Moneti, and Moorwood) numbers. The original five stars were identified as numbers Q1, Q2, Q3, Q4, and Q9, with additional sources Q5 and Q6 identified as part of the same cluster. They were still considered to be protostars reddened by surrounding dust.

In 1994, several stars were identified as having broad helium emission lines in their spectra, and some showed narrow hydrogen emission lines. This was completely unexpected for protostars, instead suggesting the objects were much more evolved stars.  Shortly afterwards two emission line stars were classified as Wolf Rayet stars, and a third as a Luminous Blue Variable that was thought to be one of the most luminous stars in the galaxy. A small number of red supergiants were also identified, narrowing the likely age of the cluster.

In 1999, a study of nearly 600 stars in the cluster showed that the Quintuplet contained more Wolf–Rayet stars than any known cluster, as well as a second Luminous Blue Variable.  The numbers from this survey are referred to as qF, or sometimes as FMM after all three authors (but not QMM). A 2008 study of the cluster used LHO numbers for the members and clarified the status of the unusual reddened Wolf–Rayet stars as WC stars surrounded by dust presumed to be formed from colliding winds between the WR component and a less evolved OB companion.

The cluster was also catalogued as a first magnitude "stellar" source at 4.2 microns in the Air Force Geophysics Lab survey and given the number 2004 (AFGL 2004).

Properties

The Quintuplet is seen (in the infra-red) 12 arc-minutes NW of Sagittarius A* (Sgr A*).  The cluster stars and associated objects such as the Pistol Nebula have large radial velocities only likely to be from orbiting close to the galactic centre, so the cluster is thought to be physically associated with the galactic centre.  The galactic centre is considered to be about 8 kpc away, so the projected distance of the Quintuplet on the sky is 30 pc from Sagittarius A*.

The age of the quintuplet can be estimated from the likely ages of its member stars.  Mapping the stars of the cluster to evolutionary isochrones gives ages around 4 million years.  However stars such as the two (or three) LBVs are expected to explode as supernovae within three million years, an obvious problem.  It has been suggested that the age may be as low as 3.3-3.6 million years or that star formation was staggered over a million years or more Another proposal is that the remaining highly massive stars were formed or rejuvenated by binary interactions.

The masses of stars clusters can be measured by integrating the stellar mass function.

Members
The Quintuplet contains a number of massive and somewhat evolved stars, including 21 Wolf–Rayet stars, 2 luminous blue variables (three including the nearby runaway V4998 Sagittarii), and a number of red supergiants. There is also associated nebulosity ionised by the hot stars, most notably the Pistol Nebula between the Pistol Star and the core of the Quintuplet.

References

External links
 
 The Revised AFGL (RAFGL) Catalogue at SIMBAD

Open clusters
Sagittarius (constellation)